Zudel (also Romanized as Zūdel and Zūdal; also known as Rūdal and Zyudel’) is a village in Sardar-e Jangal Rural District, Sardar-e Jangal District, Fuman County, Gilan Province, Iran. At the 2006 census, its population was 23, in 9 families.

References 

Populated places in Fuman County